Mohammed Kesselly "Keka" Kamara (born 31 October 1997) is a Liberian professional footballer who plays for Hapoel Haifa.

Career

College and amateur

Tyler Junior College
Kamara moved to the United States to play college soccer at Tyler Junior College in 2016. During his two years at Tyler, Kamara scored 70 goals and tallied ten assists in just 44 games. He finished the 2017 season as the NJCAA player of the year after scoring a school record-breaking and NJCAA-leading 48 goals, which included 14 game-winners.

UCLA
In 2018, Kamara transferred to UCLA, where he made 14 appearances, scored five goals, and tallied a single assist.

Atlanta Silverbacks
During his time at college, Kamara also appeared for National Premier Soccer League side Atlanta Silverbacks, where he scored nine goals in 14 appearances.

Professional

SC Paderborn 07
Kamara was considered a strong candidate to sign a Generation Adidas deal with Major League Soccer, which would see him enter the 2019 MLS SuperDraft. However, he opted to move to Europe, signing with 2. Bundesliga side SC Paderborn on 5 January 2019.

During his time at Paderborn, Kamara failed to make a single first team appearance, but did score eight goals in seven appearances for Paderborn's 5th-tier second team who competed in the Oberliga Westfalen.

In June 2019, Kamara and Paderborn mutually agreed to terminate his contract with the club.

LA Galaxy II
On 2 August 2019, Kamara signed for USL Championship side LA Galaxy II. He made his professional debut on 11 August 2019, as an 84th-minute substitute during a 3–1 win over Austin Bold.

Menemenspor
On 1 October 2020, Kamara moved to Turkish TFF First League side Menemenspor.

References

1997 births
Living people
Association football forwards
Liberian footballers
Tyler Apaches men's soccer players
UCLA Bruins men's soccer players
Atlanta Silverbacks players
SC Paderborn 07 players
LA Galaxy II players
Hatayspor footballers
Hapoel Haifa F.C. players
National Premier Soccer League players
USL Championship players
Israeli Premier League players
Liberian expatriate footballers
Expatriate footballers in Germany
Expatriate footballers in Turkey
Expatriate soccer players in the United States
Expatriate footballers in Israel
Liberian expatriate sportspeople in Germany
Liberian expatriate sportspeople in Turkey
Liberian expatriate sportspeople in the United States
Liberian expatriate sportspeople in Israel